John Salmon may refer to:

 John Salmon (bishop) (died 1325), bishop of Norwich
 John Salmon (politician) (1808–1873), New Zealand politician
 John Salmon (entomologist) (1910–1999), New Zealand scientist and academic at Victoria University College
 John Salmon (advertising executive) (1931–2017), British advertising executive
 John Salmon (cricketer) (born 1934), Australian cricketer

See also
 John Salmond (1881–1968), British military officer
 John Salmond (judge) (1862–1924), New Zealand legal scholar and judge
 John Salmons (born 1979), American former professional basketball player